Association Sportive Les Marsouins, is a football (soccer) club from Saint-Leu, Réunion Island.

Stadium
The club plays their home matches at Stade Saint-Leu, which has a maximum capacity of 1,000 people.

Achievements
Réunion Premier League: 1
2000

Coupe de la Réunion: 2
1997, 2007

Performance in CAF competitions
CAF Champions League: 1 appearance
2001 – First Round

CAF Cup Winners' Cup: 2 appearances
1998 – First Round
1999 – First Round

The club in the French football structure
French Cup: 1 appearance
2000–01

References

Marsouins
Association football clubs established in 1955
1955 establishments in Réunion